C. D. Anderson may refer to

Carl David Anderson (1905–1991), American physicist, Nobel laureate
Charles D. Anderson (1827–1901), Confederate general
Charles DeWitt Anderson (1827–1901), Confederate colonel